The Guide to the Perfect Family is a Canadian comedy-drama film, directed by Ricardo Trogi and released in 2021. The film stars Louis Morissette and Catherine Chabot as Martin Dubois and Marie-Soleil Blouin, a married couple whose tendency toward helicopter parenting creates problems for Rose (Émilie Bierre), Louis's 16-year-old daughter from his prior marriage to Caroline (Isabelle Guérard).

The film premiered theatrically in Quebec on July 14, 2021. It has also been acquired for international distribution on Netflix.

In its year-end review of Canadian film and television in 2021, the trade magazine Playback named it the Film of the Year.

References

External links

2021 films
2021 comedy-drama films
Canadian comedy-drama films
Films shot in Quebec
Films set in Quebec
Films directed by Ricardo Trogi
2020s French-language films
French-language Canadian films
2020s Canadian films